Arenca Trashani (born 20 June 1973 in Shkodër) has been a member of the Assembly of the Republic of Albania for the Democratic Party of Albania  during 2005 – 2013 from the Shkodër County.
She served as Minister of European Integration during 2005 – 2007.

References

Living people
Place of birth missing (living people)
Democratic Party of Albania politicians
21st-century Albanian politicians
21st-century Albanian women politicians
Government ministers of Albania
Women government ministers of Albania
Integration ministers of Albania
Members of the Parliament of Albania
Women members of the Parliament of Albania
1973 births